Mathias Clement Lenihan, (October 6, 1854 – August 19, 1943) was a 20th-century archbishop in the Catholic Church in the United States.  He served as bishop of the Diocese of Great Falls in the state of Montana from 1904-30.

Biography

Early life & ministry
Born in Dubuque, Iowa, Lenihan was educated at St. Joseph College in Dubuque, St. John's College in Prairie du Chien, Wisconsin and the Grand séminaire de Montréal in Canada.  He was ordained a Catholic priest on December 20, 1879 by Bishop John Hennessy for the Diocese of Dubuque.  He was the first native born Iowan to be ordained a priest.  From the time of his ordination until 1904 he was involved in parish ministry in the diocese, and later archdiocese, of Dubuque.  His first assignment was at Vail and his second was at Marshalltown.  In Marshallton he founded St. Thomas Hospital in memory of his brother, the Rt. Rev. Thomas Mathias Lenihan, who had served as bishop of the Diocese of Cheyenne.

Bishop of Great Falls
On August 26, 1904 Pope Pius X named him to be the first bishop of Great Falls. He was consecrated a bishop on September 21, 1904 by Archbishop John Joseph Keane of Dubuque.  The co-consecrators were Bishops James John Keane of Cheyenne and Joseph Bernard Cotter, of Winona.  He was installed on November 5, 1904 at St. Ann Cathedral in Great Falls.

Bishop Lenihan served the diocese for 26 years.  He was involved in temperance reform, building the parochial school system in the diocese, and constructing a new cathedral. The new St. Ann Cathedral in Great Falls was dedicated on December 15, 1907. He was instrumental in establishing an orphanage staffed by the Sisters of Charity of Providence. The diocese also established several new parishes during his episcopate. 
  
Pope Pius XI  accepted his resignation as bishop of Great Falls on January 18, 1930.  He was named Titular Archbishop of Preslavus on February 14, 1930. He retired to Dubuque and died there on August 19, 1943.

References

1854 births
1943 deaths
People from Dubuque, Iowa
Loras College alumni
Roman Catholic Archdiocese of Dubuque
Roman Catholic bishops of Great Falls
20th-century Roman Catholic bishops in the United States
People from Marshalltown, Iowa
Religious leaders from Iowa
Catholics from Iowa